Siddick Sayed el-Mahdi (1911–1961), was a religious and political leader in Sudan. He was born in northern Sudan, the son of Abd-el-Rahman el-Mahdi and thus belonged to one of the leading families in the country. He believed in non-violent method of a free Sudan, and in 1945 he formed the Umma party together with his father.  He was the father of Sadiq el-Mahdi, and the brother of Hadi Abd-el-Rahman el-Mahdi.

1911 births
1961 deaths
National Umma Party politicians